Akhan may refer to:

 Əhən, a village in Azerbaijan
 , a mahalle in Pamukkale, Turkey
 , a caravanserai in Denizli Province, Turkey
 , a caravanserai in Aksaray Province. Turkey

See also 
 Achan (disambiguation)
 Ahan (disambiguation)